Anthony Watson may refer to:

Sports
 Anthony Watson (athlete, born 1910) (1910–1970), English athlete
 Anthony Watson (athlete, born 1941), American Olympic athlete
 Anthony Watson (basketball) (born 1964), American former basketball player
 Anthony Watson (rugby union) (born 1994), English rugby union player
 Anthony Watson (skeleton racer) (born 1989), American-born skeleton racer who competed on behalf of Jamaica
 Tony Watson (born 1985), American baseball player

Others
 Anthony Watson (admiral) (born 1941), American naval officer
 Anthony Watson (bishop) (died 1605), English bishop
 Anthony G. Watson, former CIO of Nike and Barclays, LGBT rights activist
 Anthony Reynard Watson, American soul singer

See also
Anton Watson (born 2000), American basketball player
Antonio Watson (born 2001), Jamaican sprinter